Payam Malekian is an Iranian football defender who currently plays for Iranian football club Naft Masjed Soleyman in the Persian Gulf Pro League.

References

1996 births
Living people
Iranian footballers
Siah Jamegan players
Association football defenders
Naft Masjed Soleyman F.C. players